Louis Fenn Wadsworth (May 6, 1825 – March 26, 1908) was an American baseball pioneer, who was a player and organizer with the New York Knickerbockers in the 1840s. He is credited with helping develop the number of innings and players on each team.

Born in either Hartford, Connecticut, Litchfield, Connecticut or Amenia, New York, Wadsworth graduated from Washington College (now Trinity College in Hartford, Conn.), and worked as a naval office attorney in the New York Custom House. "A tempestuous character," wrote MLB's official historian John Thorn, "Wadsworth commenced his ball playing days with the Gothams, a venerable club that actually predated the Knickerbockers, with whom he quickly achieved prominence as the top first baseman of his time. Then, on April 1, 1854, he switched his allegiance to the Knickerbockers ... perhaps for 'emoluments,' as recompense was euphemistically known then; his skilled play would increase the Knickerbockers’ chances of victory. It is these circumstances that incline me to believe that Wadsworth may thus be termed baseball's first professional player."

He was mentioned in the 1908 Spalding guide, in regards to the Mills Commission's findings of the origins of baseball, although nobody on the Mills commission could locate him. A statement by Duncan Curry revealed that “a diagram, showing the ball field laid out substantially as it is today, was brought to the field one day by a Mr. Wadsworth.”  Unbeknownst to the members of the Mills commission, he died in a poorhouse in Plainfield, New Jersey 8 days after the Spalding Guide was released. He had purportedly taken to drink and squandered what was once a $300,000 fortune ($ in  dollars).

Notes

References

1825 births
1908 deaths
19th-century baseball players
Baseball developers
New York Knickerbockers players
Baseball players from Connecticut